Admiral Talbot may refer to:

Cecil Ponsonby Talbot (1884–1970), British Royal Navy vice admiral
Charles Talbot (Royal Navy officer) (1801–1876), British Royal Navy admiral
Fitzroy Talbot (1909–1998), British Royal Navy vice admiral
John Talbot (Royal Navy officer) (c. 1769–1851), British Royal Navy admiral
P. H. Talbot (1897–1974), U.S. Navy rear admiral